This is a list of Sheriffs of Daviess County, Kentucky. The Sheriff is elected to serve a four-year term.

The current Daviess County Sheriff is Bradley R. Youngman

Daviess County, Kentucky

Sheriffs of Daviess County, Kentucky
Kentucky, Daviess